Daviesia pedunculata is a species of flowering plant in the family Fabaceae and is endemic to south-western Western Australia. It is a spreading or sprawling to erect shrub with erect, egg-shaped to elliptic phyllodes, and yellow and maroon flowers.

Description

Taxonomy and naming
Daviesia pedunculata was first formally described in 1839 by John Lindley from an unpublished description by George Bentham. Lindley's description was published in A Sketch of the Vegetation of the Swan River Colony. The specific epithet (pedunculata) means "pedunculate".

Distribution and habitat
This bitter-pea grows in heathland near Kalbarri, around Eneabba and near Perth in the Esperance Plains, Geraldton Sandplains, Jarrah Forest and Swan Coastal Plain biogeographic regions of south-western Western Australia.

References

pedunculata
Flora of Western Australia
Plants described in 1839
Taxa named by John Lindley